Leuconitocris bimaculata is a species of beetle in the family Cerambycidae. It was described by Franz in 1942.

References

Leuconitocris
Beetles described in 1942